FC Pele Moscow was a Russian football team from Moscow. It played professionally in the Russian Second Division in 1992, taking 5th place in Zone 3 and dissolved after that season.

External links
  Team history at KLISF

Association football clubs established in 1992
Association football clubs disestablished in 1993
Defunct football clubs in Moscow
1992 establishments in Russia
1993 disestablishments in Russia